Macarius II or Makarios II may refer to:

Pope Macarius II of Alexandria (d. 1128), Coptic leader
Macarius II of Antioch (r. 1164–1166), Greek Orthodox patriarch of Antioch
Makarios II of Cyprus (d. 1950), archbishop
Macarius (Nevsky) (r. 1912–1917), metropolitan of Moscow